Neun may refer to:

 Jörg Neun, a retired German football player
 Johnny Neun, who was an American first baseman for the Detroit Tigers and the Boston Braves
 Manfred Neun, a German entrepreneur
 NeuN, a protein marker of neurons, concentrated in neuronal nuclei